Alexius I or Alexios I Komnenos (1048–1118), was Byzantine Emperor.

Alexius I may also refer to:

 Alexius of Constantinople, Ecumenical Patriarch in 1025–1043
 Alexios I of Trebizond (c. 1182 – 1222), Emperor of Trapezunt
 Alexis of Russia (1629–1676), second Russian tsar of the Romanov dynasty
 Patriarch Alexy I of Moscow (1877–1970), 13th Patriarch of Moscow